Eviel Pérez Magaña (born 6 April 1963) is a Mexican politician affiliated with the PRI. After being the last Minister of Social Development from 2018 to 2019 with Enrique Peña Nieto administration, he currently dedicated to his private business and enterprises. Before being the head of the Ministry he was undersecretary of social development programs in the same Ministry. Previously he was Senator of the LXII Legislature of the Mexican Congress representing Oaxaca in the Senate he was the president of the indigenous affairs commission. He also served as Deputy during the LXI Legislature and as municipal president of Tuxtepec.

References

External links
 

1963 births
Living people
Politicians from Oaxaca
Members of the Senate of the Republic (Mexico)
Members of the Chamber of Deputies (Mexico)
Institutional Revolutionary Party politicians
21st-century Mexican politicians
Municipal presidents in Oaxaca